Peter Patterson (April 10, 1825 – July 24, 1904) was an Ontario businessman and political figure. He represented York West in Legislative Assembly of Ontario, Canada, from 1871 to 1883.

He was born in Londonderry, New Hampshire in 1825 and came to Canada West in 1849. Patterson and his brothers, operating as Patterson Brothers, manufactured agricultural equipment in the Richmond Hill area. They also operated a sawmill, gristmill, foundry and blacksmith shop. The company provided living quarters for their workers, a school and church near the factory. Peter served as reeve for Vaughan Township from 1868 to 1871. In 1886, the operation was relocated to Woodstock to gain access to cheaper transportation via rail. The company was taken over by Massey-Harris in 1891. He died at Vaughan in 1904.

References

External links

Early Days in Richmond Hill
The Canadian parliamentary companion and annual register, 1878, CH Mackintosh

1825 births
1904 deaths
People from Londonderry, New Hampshire
Ontario Liberal Party MPPs